Hollinshed is a surname. Notable people with the surname include:

Marjorie Hollinshed (1905–1995), Australian ballet dancer and dance teacher
Ottiwell Hollinshed (fl. 1550s), Canon of Windsor from 1550 to 1554

See also
Hollinshead